Commission on Federal Ethics Law Reform was a commission established by President George H. W. Bush in  to review federal ethics laws, executive orders, and policies and to make recommendations to the president for legislative, administrative, and other reforms needed to ensure full public confidence in the integrity of all federal public officials and employees.

Committee members:

 Malcolm Richard Wilkey—Chairman
 Griffin B. Bell—Vice Chairman
 Jan Witold Baran
 Judith Hippler Bello
 Lloyd N. Cutler
 Fred Fisher Fielding
 Harrison H. Schmitt
 R. James Woolsey

References
 Executive Order 12668 - President's Commission on Federal Ethics Law Reform
 List of members

Reports of the United States government
United States documents
Federal Ethics Law Reform, Commission on
Ethics commissions
Law reform in the United States
Presidency of George H. W. Bush